The Bagdad Bypass is a proposed bypass of the Midland Highway, through Bagdad, Tasmania. While not a new proposal, the idea began gaining momentum on the release of the Southern Transport Investment Program in 2007. The road will be initially constructed as a two-lane highway with extra earthworks undertaken to facilitate future duplication of the bypass. The road will be constructed as a grade separated highway and has been designed to seamlessly connect to the Brighton Bypass.
In 2010, the Department of Infrastructure, Energy and Resources released 2 potential alignments for public comment. Neither design existed wholly within the existing proclaimed corridor and ultimately, a combination of the two designs was chosen to minimize intrusion into townships while at the same time keep construction costs to a minimum by diverting the future highway away from areas that would require significant earthworks.

See also

 List of highways in Tasmania

References

External links
Project Page

Highways in Tasmania
Transport in Hobart
Highways in Hobart
Proposed roads in Australia
Bypasses